The men's Long Jump at the 2014 IAAF World Indoor Championships took place on 7–8 March 2014.

Medalists

Records

Qualification standards

Schedule

Results

Qualification
Qualification: 8.05 (Q) or at least 8 best performers (q) qualified for the final.

Final

References

Long Jump
Long jump at the World Athletics Indoor Championships